is a passenger railway station located in  Kita-ku, Sakai, Osaka Prefecture, Japan, operated by the private railway operator Nankai Electric Railway. It has the station number "NK60".

Lines

Layout
The station consists of two island platforms with an elevated station building.

Platforms

Adjacent stations

History
Shirasagi Station opened on May 25, 1964.

Passenger statistics
In fiscal 2019, the station was used by an average of 10,676 passengers daily.

Surrounding area
 Osaka Prefecture University
Osaka Prefectural Higashi Mozu High School
 Sakai City Nakamozu Junior High School
 Sakai City Higashimozu Junior High School

See also
 List of railway stations in Japan

References

External links

  

Railway stations in Japan opened in 1964
Railway stations in Osaka Prefecture
Sakai, Osaka